The Museum of the Sahrawi people's Liberation Army is located in the Sahrawi refugee camps, in the southwest of Algeria. This museum is dedicated to the struggle for the independence of the Sahrawi people. It presents weapons, vehicles and uniforms used as well as abundant documentation history. 

Currently it is also the seat of the Government of the Sahrawi Arab Democratic Republic.

List of exhibits

Vehicles
AMX-13 F3
Eland-20
Eland-90
AML-90
Panhard M3
SK-105 Kürassier
Unimog
VAB

Towed artillery
M101 howitzer
B-11 recoilless rifle
M40 recoilless rifle
L118 light gun

Small arms and explosives
AK-47
FN FAL
Heckler & Koch G3
Heckler & Koch MP5
M72 LAW
Browning M1919
TS-50 mine
VS-50 mine

See also 
 Polisario

References 

Sahrawi Arab Democratic Republic
Museums in Algeria
Military and war museums
Tindouf Province